

External links 

Lists of 2014 term United States Supreme Court opinions